Chay Bijar (also Romanized as Chāy Bījār; also known as Bāzār, Chāh Bījā, Chāh Bījār, Chāy Bejār, and Chay-Bidzhar) is a village in Chahar Farizeh Rural District, in the Central District of Bandar-e Anzali County, Gilan Province, Iran. At the 2006 census, its population was 86, in 27 families.

References 

Populated places in Bandar-e Anzali County